N-acetyl-L-glutamate synthetase may refer to:
 Amino-acid N-acetyltransferase
 Glutamate N-acetyltransferase